Bradford Hammerton Street Depot was a traction maintenance depot located in Bradford, West Yorkshire, England. The depot was near Bradford Exchange station. 

The depot code was HS.

History 
Before its closure in 1984, the depot had an allocation of steam engines until 1958, when it closed to steam engines so it could concentrate in diesel engines. After that, it had an allocation of Class 03, 04, 05, 08 and 20 locomotives as well as Class 104 and 110 DMUs. After its closure in 1984, these locos and DMUs were either  sent to other depots or withdrawn. The site is now occupied by First Bradford as a bus depot.

References 
 

Railway depots in Yorkshire